The Tirekhtyakh Range is a mountain range in the Sakha Republic (Yakutia), Far Eastern Federal District, Russia. The nearest city is Batagay to the north of the range.

The closest airport is Batagay Airport.

Geography
The Tirekhtyakh Range rises in the area of the Yana-Oymyakon Highlands, part of the Chersky Mountains, to the west of the Adycha, south of the Borulakh and north of the Nelgese.

The slightly larger and higher Nelgesin Range, another subrange of the Chersky Mountains, rises to the south, stretching roughly parallel to the general direction of the Tirekhtyakh Range.

See also
List of mountains and hills of Russia

References

External links
Hiking in the area (in Russian)
State geological map of the Russian Federation, scale 1: 200,000. Map of minerals and patterns of their distribution.
Landscapes as a reflection of the toponyms of Yakutia
Ranges of Russia

Mountain ranges of the Sakha Republic
Chersky Range
ceb:Tirekhtyakhskiy Khrebet
sah:Тирэхтээх